Abdurrahman Stadium Roza Haxhiu Stadium (or: Stadium A. Roza Haxhiu) is a stadium for many uses in Lushnja, Albania. It is currently used mostly for the football match and is the host field for the KS Lushnja team. The stadium has a capacity of 8,500 seats and a standing capacity of about 12,000 participants.

History
The football field where Traktori Lushnja was playing before the 1960s was exactly where is today's "18 October" gymnasium in the city center. Since the 1960s, the construction of today's stadium of the city of Lushnja has begun. It had the name Tractor, just like the name of the team. In 1992, with the decision of the Lushnja Municipal Council, the football stadium was awarded the honorary name of the legendary Albanian legend Abdurrahman Roza Haxhiu respect for the contribution that this footballer and coach has given to football and Albanian football. The stadium capacity "A. Roza Haxhiu "is about 8 thousand seats. Stadium Tribune "A. Roza Haxhiu "has been painted with the colors of the yellow and green Lushnja team and in her center is located a great portrait of football legend Lusnjarë dhe Albanët Abdurrahman Roza Haxhiu. In the premises of the stadium "A. Roza Haxhiu "after the opening of two Lushnja 20th-century sports photos in 2006 and 2008 and the 20th century edition of Lushnja's sport history,Mr.Vergjil XHAFA opened in 2015 the Lushnja football museum. In this museum are placed numerous photographs that reflect the whole history of football. Also located is the bust of the martyr of the legendary Albanian field Abdurrahman Roza Haxhiu worked very skillfully and professionally by sculptor Lushnjar Mr.Maks Bushi.

Stadium
The Stadium Abdurrahman Roza Haxhiu is a very old stadium that seats 8,500 and 12,000 standing capacity. The stadium opened in 1961. The stadium was established at Communism Era. This was one of the biggest stadiums in Albania at the time. This stadium has had international games like the Albania national under-19 football team and the Kazakhstan national under-19 football team.

References

an

Football venues in Albania
Multi-purpose stadiums in Albania
Buildings and structures in Lushnjë
KF Lushnja